The 1985 New York Mets season was the 24th regular season for the Mets. They went 98–64 and finished 2nd in the NL East; the team stayed in contention to win the division title until the last week of the season. They were managed by Davey Johnson. They played their home games at Shea Stadium.

Offseason
 December 3, 1984: Lou Thornton was drafted from the Mets by the Toronto Blue Jays in the rule 5 draft.
 December 10, 1984: Hubie Brooks, Mike Fitzgerald, Herm Winningham, and Floyd Youmans were traded by the Mets to the Montreal Expos for Gary Carter.
 January 3, 1985: Rusty Staub was signed as a free agent by the Mets.
 January 18, 1985: The Mets traded Tim Leary to the Milwaukee Brewers as part of a 4-team trade. The Kansas City Royals sent Frank Wills to the Mets. The Texas Rangers traded Danny Darwin and a player to be named later to the Brewers. The Brewers sent Jim Sundberg to the Royals. The Royals sent Don Slaught to the Rangers. The Rangers completed the deal by sending Bill Nance (minors) to the Brewers on January 30.
February 2, 1985: Rick Anderson was signed as a free agent with the New York Mets.

Regular season
 Gary Carter led the Mets in HR and RBI.
 July 4, 1985: Keith Hernandez hit for the cycle in a 16–13 game that lasted 19 innings vs. the Atlanta Braves.
 July 11, 1985: Nolan Ryan got the 4000th strikeout of his career by striking out Mets player Danny Heep.
 July 20, 1985: Darryl Strawberry had 7 RBIs in a game versus the Atlanta Braves.

Season standings

Record vs. opponents

Opening Day starters
 Wally Backman, Second Base
 Gary Carter, Catcher
 George Foster, Outfield
 Dwight Gooden, Pitcher
 Keith Hernandez, First Base
 Howard Johnson, Third Base
 Rafael Santana, Shortstop
 Darryl Strawberry, Outfield
 Mookie Wilson, Outfield

Notable transactions
 June 3, 1985: Gordon Dillard was drafted by the Mets in the 2nd round of the 1985 Major League Baseball draft (Secondary Phase), but did not sign.

Roster

Game log

Regular season

|-

|-

|-

|- style="background:#bbcaff;"
| – || July 16 || ||colspan=10 |1985 Major League Baseball All-Star Game at Hubert H. Humphrey Metrodome in Minneapolis
|-

|-

|-

|-

|- style="text-align:center;"
| Legend:       = Win       = Loss       = PostponementBold = Mets team member

Player stats

Batting

Starters by position
Note: Pos = Position; G = Games played; AB = At bats; H = Hits; Avg. = Batting average; HR = Home runs; RBI = Runs batted in

Other batters
Note: G = Games played; AB = At bats; H = Hits; Avg. = Batting average; HR = Home runs; RBI = Runs batted in

Pitching

Starting pitchers 
Note: G = Games played; GS = Games started; CG = Complete games; SHO = Shutouts; IP = Innings pitched; W = Wins; L = Losses; ERA = Earned run average; SO = Strikeouts

Other pitchers 
Note: G = Games pitched; IP = Innings pitched; W = Wins; L = Losses; ERA = Earned run average; SO = Strikeouts

Relief pitchers 
Note: G = Games pitched; W = Wins; L = Losses; SV = Saves; ERA = Earned run average; SO = Strikeouts

Awards and honors
 Dwight Gooden, Associated Press Athlete of the Year
 Dwight Gooden, National League Cy Young Award Winner
 Dwight Gooden, National League Pitching Triple Crown
 Dwight Gooden, The Sporting News Pitcher of the Year
 Keith Hernandez, National League First Base Gold Glove
 Gary Carter, National League Catcher Silver Slugger
 Keith Hernandez – Player of the Month, July 1985
 Keith Hernandez – Hernandez set a major league record for game-winning runs batted in (24) in 1985
 Gary Carter – Player of the Month, September 1985
 Rafael Santana – Led NL Shortstops in Putouts (301)
All-Star Game
 Darryl Strawberry, right field, starter
 Gary Carter, catcher
 Ron Darling, pitcher
 Dwight Gooden, pitcher (Injured, did not play)

Farm system 

LEAGUE CHAMPIONS: Tidewater, Jackson

References

External links
1985 New York Mets at Baseball Reference
1985 New York Mets at Baseball Almanac

New York Mets seasons
New York Mets
New York Mets
1980s in Queens